Hampstead, Virginia may refer to:

Hampstead (Tunstall, Virginia), a historic plantation house located near Tunstall in New Kent County
Hampstead, New Kent County, Virginia, an unincorporated settlement named for the plantation house
Hampstead, King George County, Virginia, an unincorporated settlement named after Hampstead in England